Kopervik is the largest town on the island of Karmøy in Rogaland county, Norway.  It is also the administrative centre of the municipality of Karmøy. It is part of the traditional district of Haugaland. The town was also an independent municipality from 1866 until 1965.

The municipality of Karmøy has about 42,000 inhabitants, so this means Kopervik is home to about 25% of the municipal population.

Kopervik is one of three towns in Karmøy (the others are Åkrehamn and Skudeneshavn). Kopervik is a transportation hub for scheduled boats going north to Bergen and south to Stavanger. The main industries are aluminium smelting and fishing. Kopervik contains Karmøy's municipal government buildings as well as a lot of the commercial development in the municipality. Kopervik Church has been located in the town for a long time. The previous church building was destroyed by fire in 2010, and its replacement was completed in 2016.

History
The village of Kopervik was declared a ladested (town) on 16 August 1866, and since towns could not be part of a rural municipality, it was separated from the municipality of Avaldsnes to form an urban municipality of its own. Initially, Kopervik had a population of 737 and it encompassed . On 1 January 1965, there were many big municipal mergers in Norway due to the work of the Schei Committee, and on that date the town of Kopervik was merged with the neighboring municipalities of Avaldsnes, Stangaland, Torvastad, Skudenes, and Åkra and with the nearby town of Skudeneshavn.  Together these municipalities formed the new, large municipality of Karmøy. Prior to the merger, Kopervik had 1,737 residents. Kopervik lost its status as a "town" upon merging into Karmøy municipality. In 1996, due to some changes in the laws on towns, Karmøy municipality declared Kopervik to be a town once again.

According to legend, King Sverre I of Norway ordered the construction of a wooden castle on the headland at the entrance to the harbour where Kopervik is located today. A part of Kopervik is therefore called Treborg, literally meaning "wooden castle". There is however no evidence of its existence.  Kopervik was also home to Tormod Torfæus, appointed as the official Royal Norwegian historian to the Danish king during the Kingdom of Denmark-Norway.

Government
From 1866 through 1963, Kopervik was an independent municipality that was responsible for primary education (through 10th grade), outpatient health services, senior citizen services, unemployment and other social services, zoning, economic development, and municipal roads.  The municipality was governed by a municipal council of elected representatives, which in turn elects a mayor.

Municipal council
The municipal council  of Kopervik was made up of representatives that were elected to four year terms.  The party breakdown of the final municipal council was as follows:

Notable residents
 Jan Kjell Larsen, footballer
 Svein Munkejord, Former fisheries minister
 Asbjørn Sunde (1909-1985), Saboteur against the Nazi occupation of Norway 
 Tormod Torfæus (1636—1719), Icelandic-Norwegian historian 
 Øyvind Vaksdal, Politician

References

External links 
Kopervik.info
HistoricVideo
Kopervik Map
Kopervik Videregående Skole
Kopervik Weather forecast
Kopervik Map
Kopervik IL (football club)
Kopervik Volleyballklubb
Byen Vår Kopervik
Anne Beth Hagen Tekstilkunstner Kopervik Kulturhus

Karmøy
Former municipalities of Norway
Cities and towns in Norway
Populated places in Rogaland
1866 establishments in Norway
1965 disestablishments in Norway
1996 establishments in Norway